The 1920 West Virginia Mountaineers football team was an American football team that represented West Virginia University as an independent during the 1920 college football season. In its fourth season under head coach Mont McIntire, the team compiled a 5–4–1 record and outscored opponents by a total of 169 to 113.

Schedule

References

West Virginia
West Virginia Mountaineers football seasons
West Virginia Mountaineers football